Sibylle Merk (born as Sibylle Powarzynski, 5 February 1968) is a German former yacht racer who competed in the 1996 Summer Olympics.

References

1968 births
Living people
German female sailors (sport)
Olympic sailors of Germany
Sailors at the 1996 Summer Olympics – Europe